Nomcamba is a town in OR Tambo District Municipality in the Eastern Cape province of South Africa.

References

Populated places in the King Sabata Dalindyebo Local Municipality